Rogelia is a 1962 Spanish drama film directed by Rafael Gil and starring Pina Pellicer, Arturo Fernández and Fernando Rey. It is based on Armando Palacio Valdés's 1926 novel Saint Rogelia. A 1940 film adaptation had previously been made.

Main cast
 Pina Pellicer as Rogelia 
 Arturo Fernández as Fernando Vilches  
 Fernando Rey as Máximo García  
 Mabel Karr as Cristina 
 Arturo López as Pedro  
 Félix de Pomés as Duque  
 María Luisa Ponte as Baldomera  
 Félix Fernández as Don Heliodoro  
 Irán Eory as Nanette  
 Rosa Palomar as Actriz en fiesta 
 José María Tasso as Fotógrafo  
 José María Caffarel as Director del penal  
 Félix Dafauce as Don Luis  
 Lola Gaos as Mendiga 
 Tomás Blanco as Capitán de Regulares 
 José Nieto as Preso

References

Bibliography 
 Goble, Alan. The Complete Index to Literary Sources in Film. Walter de Gruyter, 1999.

External links 
 

1962 drama films
Spanish drama films
1962 films
1960s Spanish-language films
Films directed by Rafael Gil
Remakes of Spanish films

Films scored by Juan Quintero Muñoz
1960s Spanish films